Jacopo Furio Sarno (born September 1, 1989) is an Italian actor, voice actor and singer. Since 2013 Sarno has been known as "Jake Sarno". Active in the world of acting as a child, he began starring in several sitcoms, most produced by Mediaset. In the early 2000s he continued to work as an actor in theater and film, as well as on television, where he became one of the familiar faces of the sitcom produced by Disney Channel. During his career he has also tried his hand engraving of records and conducting television.

Biography
He is the son of Patrizia Bissi and Franz A. Sarno. In 2015 he received his Master of Philosophy degree in Università degli Studi di Milano.

Acting and television
He made his debut very young and became a familiar face of television by the second half of the 90s, playing in some sitcom and advertising.

In 1995 he made his debut as an actor in the sitcom  Io e la mamma  (Mom and I), alongside Gerry Scotti and Delia Scala, playing the role Paolino for all seasons, until 1997. Two years later, back on television, he was a regular on Canale 5 and in a sitcom Don Luca, where he played the role of Mirko for only two seasons. The following year he made his film debut, playing a small part in the last film the fantasy saga Fantozzi 2000 - La clonazione (Fantozzi 2000 – Cloning), in which he played the role of a child abandoned by parents too busy with their work. In 2001 he went back to basics and provides the sitcom Bradipo (Sloth), aired on MTV Italy, after a three-year hiatus, he played a small part in the sitcom Il Mammo (The Mom) with Enzo Iachetti and Natalia Estrada.

In 1996 reads short film Il soffitto (The Ceiling), directed by Barbara Nava, and this interpretation was considered Best Actor Film Festival Messina. He debuted in 2006 as a television host for the music program Nickelodeon Kids' Choice Awards Destination Kids by Nickelodeon. The following year he starred on the show for children of Jaky "Quelli dell'intervallo", while in 2010 he obtained a main role in the film by Massimo Boldi "A Natale mi sposo".

In the same period he made some appearances in television series "Fiore e Tinelli" and "The Suite Life on Deck", and the music video for the song "Grazie a te" (Thank you), Ambra Lo Faro.

In 2011 he was one of the stars of Canale 5 television series "Non smettere di sognare", in the part of Phil. In the summer of that year leads, Satellite DeAKids issuer, "Arriva lo Zecchino", transmission itinerant shows the auditions for the 2011 edition of the "Zecchino d'Oro".
 
In 2004, starred in the ad of Mineral water "Uliveto" with Alessandro Del Piero. He also starred in advertising spots for brands such as: Sky, Swisscom, Levissima, Chocapic, OroCiock, TIM, Corriere della Sera, Cebion, Proraso, Saiwa, Geox, Panini and Kinder Merendero.

Dubbing
From 1999 is entered to the "Associazione Doppiatori Attori Pubblicitari" (ADAP) (Voiced Actors Advertising Association), beginning the same year his career as a voice actor.

Besides the dubbing of many films, of course, for the roles of young people and cartoon characters, lends his voice several times and several characters, including the sparrow protagonist of the famous advertising with Alessandro Del Piero also the voice of Harry Potter in video game learned from books. In 2009, at the film festival in Viareggio Europa Cinema he won the award for the best artist.

Drama and musical

In addition to film and television actor, he performed well at the theater in some musical, after studying some of the techniques of music, including singing and music theory, guitar and harmonica blues. These studies have allowed him to also take a career in music, participating in the Castrocaro Music Festival in 2004, where he reached the semi-finals, also is a component of a new band Hard Rock Milan because he had previously taken part in another group of the same city and same kind of music the Dusty Heads (heads covered with dust) and in both has and has had the role of singer.

From 2005 until the spring of 2007 was in tour with the musical Datemi tre caravelle, directed by Gianni Quaranta, with Alessandro Preziosi, while in March 2008 part with the important leading role in the Italian stage version of High School Musical on Stage!.

Addition, Jacopo participate Disney Channel Original Series Quelli dell'intervallo, aired on Disney Channel Italy. Still working on Disney Channel made an appearance in the series "Fiore e Tinelli" (Flower and Tinelli) with his former colleagues (Matteo Leoni) playing Matthew and (Andrea Leon) playing Jason, the leader of a band in which Fiore (Francesca Calabrese) wants enter.

In 2007 appears in the music video "Grazie a te" (Thank you) the singer and colleague in Quelli dell'intervallo, (Ambra Lo Faro).

Also, for Disney, Jacopo made an appearance in the episode ("When in Rome...") the first season of the TV series The Suite Life on Deck playing (Luca Fendini), a musician Italian who met in Rome, London and fell in love.

Finally, in 2009, he released his first album 1989 and his first single from his album "È Tardi". In March 2010 released an EP Jacopo Sarno containing the single "Tommy E La Sedia Vuota", written with Nicholas Agliardi, and a selection of songs from 1989.

Despite his young age, Jacopo is also working on the humanitarian front. Since 2009 he is testimonials Change Onlu] Association.

In 2010 it published a maxi single, This Is Christmas. In 2011, he recorded a cover of "Music to Watch Girls By" Bob Crewe with Stefano Signoroni & The Muffinchasers. In the same year he signed with T.Rex Studio.

In 2013, he released another single, "Angels Till Dawn" with Mr. G and Get Far. In 2013 will be the star of the musical The Full Monty.

Career

Theatre

Cinema

Television

Dubbing

Music

Songs

2004

2008
 Non pensare più
 Tocca a me
 Wonder why
 Dimmi se sei tu
 Voglio Te, Accanto a Me feat. Ambra LoFaro (Italian version of song Right Here, Right Now from High School Musical 3: Senior Year)
 Grido (Italian version of song Scream from High School Musical 3: Senior Year)
 Non c'è confine
 Un vero amico
 Non l'avevo previsto (Italian version of song Wonder why)
 La forza del sorriso

2009
 Anche a primavera
 È tardi
 Sara
 Vent'anni
 Ho voglia di vederti
 Sogno te
 Non so volare
 Mai
 Jenny
 In ogni attimo
 La nuova stella
 Con te
 Senza regole

2010
 Tommy E La Sedia Vuota
 This is Christmas

2011
 C'è una favola per te feat. Lidia Schillaci
 A modo mio feat. Lidia Schillaci
 Music to Watch Girls By feat. Stefano Signoroni & The Muffinchasers

2013
 Angels Till Dawn feat. Mr G & Get Far
 Angels Till Dawn feat. Mr G & Get Far (Acoustic Version) with Francesca Nerozzi

2014
 Calypso Navidad feat. Stefano Signoroni & Sergio Múñiz

Discography

Studio albums
 1989 (2009)

Other albums
 Pop It Rock It (2009) – Various Artist
 A Natale mi sposo (2010) – Various Artist (Soundtrack)
 Non smettere di sognare- La colonna sonora – Various Artist (Soundtrack)
 Di Radio 105 Network – Various Artist (105 Extra)
  Get Over Collection, Vol. 1 (2013) – Get Far album 
  Dance on the Beach, Vol. 2 (2013) – Various Artist

Singles
 È tardi (2009)
 Ho voglia di vederti (2009)
 Vent'anni (2009)
 Tommy E La Sedia Vuota (2010)
 "This Is Christmas" (2010)
 Angels Till Dawn (2013)

EPs
 Jacopo Sarno (2010)
 Angels Till Dawn (EP) (2013)

Tours
Jacopo Sarno on September 1 performed in a minilive, with some tracks from his debut album 1989 in Meet & Green Festival.

The Jonas Brothers began their European tour on October 18, Jacopo Sarno was to open the tour in Italy.
Jonas Brothers World Tour 2009 in Italy was in:
 November 3 in Milan
 November 4 in Pesaro
 November 6 in Turin
Jacopo Sarno, Finley, Lost, DARI and Broken Heart College were stars New MTV Tour. Five groups took turns on stage to give fans the best of live music from March 13, 2010.
Festival had to be in:
 March 13 in Rome, PalaLottomatica
 March 14 in Milan, Mediolanum Forum
 March 20 in Mantua, PalaBam
 March 21 in Turin, Palaolimpico
 March 27 in Genoa, Vaillant Palace
 March 28 in Montichiari (BS), PalaGeorge
 April 10 in Rimini, Stadium 105
 April 11 in Bologna, Paladozza
 April 17 in Padua, Palasport
 April 18 in Florence, Nelson Mandela Forum
The MTV NEW GENERATION TOUR was delayed due to unexpected commitments of artists. The new dates will be announced soon.

Concerts
 November 10, 2010 in Savona "Forse Nevica" St. Paul's Hospital
 December 11, 2010 in Lodi
 March 27, 2011 in Savona
 June 4, 2011 in Mozzo
 July 28, 2011 in Udine
 August 12, 2011 "Rocks Back... To The Future"
 August 15, 2011 in Lama Mocogno
 September 4, 2011 in Treviso "Home Festival 2011 – Ingresso Gratuito"
 December 17, 2011 in Verona "GretArte 2011"
 April 15, 2012 "Concerto dal Vivo"
 May 11, 2012 in New York City
 May 26, 2012 in Savona

References

External links

 
 CALLIOPEA Database management system
 

1989 births
Living people
Italian pop singers
Italian male television actors
Italian male voice actors
Italian male child actors
Singers from Milan
Italian male actors
21st-century Italian  male singers